Armenia competed at the 2015 European Games, in Baku, Azerbaijan from 12 to 28 June 2015.

An exception to the restrictions on entry into Azerbaijan was made for these games, see Armenian ethnicity.

Medalist

Team

Boxing

Judo

Sambo

Taekwondo

Wrestling

Freestyle

Greco-Roman

References

Nations at the 2015 European Games
European Games
2015